Leonard Joseph LaFrance (November 3, 1902 – April 7, 1993) was a Canadian professional ice hockey forward who played 31 games in the National Hockey League for the Montreal Canadiens and Chicago Black Hawks. He was born in L'Isle-aux-Allumettes, Quebec, but grew up in Coniston, Ontario. His nickname was "The Flying Frenchman"

Playing career
LaFrance played the position of Left Wing for the National Hockey League's Montreal Canadiens from 1927 to 1928, and the Chicago Black Hawks from 1927 to 1928. His total NHL career consisted of 33 games played, 2 assists, and 2 goals scored. Prior to joining the NHL, LaFrance was noted as a decent goal scorer with several minor league teams including the Sudbury Cub Wolves of the NOJHA, Iroquois Falls Papermakers of the NOHA, and the Duluth Hornets of the USAHA and CHL. His best year in hockey was from 1930 to 1931 when as a member of the AHA's Tulsa Oilers he scored a total of 27 points.

After hockey
He retired from playing hockey following the 1935 to 1936 season with the Seattle Seahawks of the NWHL. His honors include being a member of the CHL Second All-Star Team in 1935. LaFrance later took a job as an electrician and estimator for the Universal Electric Company, in Duluth, Minnesota. He retired in 1969. He spent the rest of his life living quietly in Duluth, and spending time with friends and family, and died peacefully in 1993 at the age of 90.

Career Statistics

References

External links

  Legends of Hockey - Leo LaFrance

1902 births
1993 deaths
Calgary Tigers players
Canadian expatriate ice hockey players in the United States
Canadian ice hockey forwards
Chicago Blackhawks players
Duluth Hornets players
Ice hockey people from Ontario
Ice hockey people from Quebec
Kansas City Pla-Mors players
Minneapolis Millers (CHL) players
Montreal Canadiens players
People from Outaouais
Sportspeople from Greater Sudbury
Tulsa Oilers (AHA) players
Wichita Blue Jays players